Palazzo delle Albere is a Renaissance villa-fortress in Trento, northern Italy. It was built during the 16th century by the Madruzzo family of prince-bishops of Trento. It takes its name (meaning "Palace of the Trees") from the rows of poplars that once led to the castle; it is surrounded by a park, now smaller than once because it is crossed by the Brenner Railway and partly occupied by the Trento Monumental Cemetery. It has a square plan, with four square, 6 m-wide and 20 m tall corner towers, surrounded by a ditch. 

In the Great Hall, on the second floor, were once frescoes celebrating emperor Charles V's deeds. Still visible are instead the depictions of the 12 months. The third floor has also kept numerous Renaissance frescoes, depicting imaginary landscapes with ruins and castles, as well as the seven Liberal arts, the four Cardinal virtues and the three Theological virtues.

According to legend, it was connected by a secret tunnel to the city's cathedral, which was used by the prince-bishops move unseen between them.

From 1987 to 2011, Palazzo delle Albere was the seat of the Museum of Modern and Contemporary Art of Trento and Rovereto (MART).

References

Sources

Houses completed in the 16th century
Buildings and structures in Trento
Renaissance architecture in Trentino-Alto Adige/Südtirol
Albere
Albere
Museums in Trentino-Alto Adige/Südtirol